
Yours may refer to:

Music

Albums
 Yours (Nathaniel album), a 2015 album by Nathaniel Willemse
 Yours (Russell Dickerson album), a 2017 album by Russell Dickerson
 Yours (Sara Gazarek album), a 2005 album by Sara Gazarek

Songs
 "Yours" (Quiéreme mucho), a 1911 criolla-bolero by Gonzalo Roig
 "Yours" (Ella Henderson song), 2014
 "Yours" (Russell Dickerson song), 2015
 "Yours" (Steven Curtis Chapman song), 2008
 "Yours", a 2014 song by M.I from The Chairman

Other uses
 Yours, the possessive pronoun version of you and a form of valediction
 "Yours", a 1943 commonly used name of the World War II poem "The Life That I Have"
 Yours (film), a 2010 Spanish fantasy drama film

See also
 Yaws, a tropical infection of the skin, bones and joints